The 315th Fighter Squadron is an active squadron of the United States Air Force.  It is an active associate fighter squadron assigned to the 495th Fighter Group and integrated into the 158th Fighter Wing, Vermont Air National Guard.  It was activated in 2016 in Burlington, Vermont.  Prior to that it was last active at Camp Shanks, New York, in November 1945.

The unit was activated in July 1942 as one of the three squadrons of the 324th Fighter Group.  After training in the United States, it moved to Egypt in July 1942 and engaged in combat in the Mediterranean Theater of Operations, moving to France following the invasion of southern France.  It received two Distinguished Unit Citations and the French Croix de Guerre with Palm for its combat actions.  Following the surrender of Germany, the 315th remained in Germany as part of the occupation forces until the fall of 1945, when it returned to the United States and was inactivated.

History

World War II

The 315th Fighter Squadron was constituted in 1942 and activated on 6 July at Mitchel Field, New York as one of the three original squadrons of the 324th Fighter Group. The squadron moved immediately to Philadelphia Municipal Airport, where it trained with Curtiss P-40 Warhawk fighters until October.

The squadron moved to Grenier Field when its parent group moved to the Middle East between October and December 1942 for operations with Ninth Air Force, the 315th joined the group in Egypt January 1943.  The unit trained for several weeks with P-40 aircraft. While group headquarters remained in Egypt, the squadron began operating with other organizations against the enemy in Tunisia. Reunited in June 1943, the squadron and group engaged primarily in escort and patrol missions between Tunisia and Sicily until July 1943. It received a Distinguished Unit Citation (DUC) for action against the enemy from March 1943 to the Allied invasion of Sicily.

The unit trained from July to October 1943 for operations with the Twelfth Air Force. It resumed combat on 30 October 1943 and directed most of its attacks against roads, bridges, motor transport, supply areas, rolling stock, gun positions, troop concentrations, and rail facilities in Italy until August 1944. During the assault on Anzio in January 1944, it patrolled the beaches and protected convoys. It aided the Allied offensive in Italy during May 1944, receiving another DUC during the Battle of Monte Cassino for action from 12 to 14 May when the group bombed an enemy position on Monastery Hill, attacked troops massing on the hill for counterattack, and hit a nearby stronghold to force the surrender of an enemy garrison.

The 315th continued to give close support to ground forces until the fall of Rome in June 1944. The group converted to Republic P-47 Thunderbolts in July and supported the assault on southern France in August by dive-bombing gun positions, bridges, and radar facilities, and by patrolling the combat zone. The unit attacked such targets as motor transport, rolling stock, rail lines, troops, bridges, gun emplacements, and supply depots after the invasion, giving tactical support to Allied forces advancing through France. The unit aided the reduction of the Colmar Pocket in January and February 1945, and supported Seventh Army's drive through the Siegfried defenses in March. It received the French Croix de Guerre with Palm for supporting French forces during the campaigns for Italy and France in 1944 and 1945.

The 315th Fighter Squadron returned to the United States between October and November 1945 and was inactivated 7 November 1945 with its parent group at Camp Shanks, New York.

Active associate unit
In July 2005, the Air Force established a small group of regular maintenance personnel with the Vermont Air National Guard at Burlington International Airport under a program originally known as the Community Basing initiative.  These personnel were assigned to Detachment 134 of the 495th Fighter Group at Shaw Air Force Base.  In January 2016 the detachment was expanded into the reactivated 315th Squadron.  Although assigned to the 495th Group, the squadron is an active associate of the 158th Fighter Wing of the Vermont Air National Guard, operating and maintaining the same aircraft.

Lineage
 Constituted as the 315th Fighter Squadron on 24 June 1942
 Activated on 6 July 1942
 Inactivated on 7 November 1945
 Activated on 9 January 2016

Assignments
 324th Fighter Group, 6 July 1942 – 7 November 1945
 495th Fighter Group, 9 January 2016 – present

Stations

 Mitchel Field, New York 6 July 1942
 Philadelphia Municipal Airport, MD 6 July 1942
 Grenier Field, New Hampshire, 23 October 1942 – 31 January 1943
 RAF Kabrit, Egypt 29 March 1943
 Tunisia,
 Kairouan Airfield, Tunisia 2 June 1943
 El Haouaria Airfield, Tunisia c. 18 June 1943
 Menzel Heurr Airfield, Tunisia 3 October 1943
 Cercola Airfield, Italy 27 October 1943
 Pignataro Maggiore Airfield, Italy, 10 May 1944

 Le Banca Airfield, Italy 7 June 1944
 Montalto Di Castro Airfield, Italy 15 June 1944
 Ghisonaccia Airfield, Corsica, 19 July 1944
 Le Luc Airfield, France 22 August 1944
 Istres Airfield (Y-17), France c. 1 September 1944
 Amberieu Airfield (Y-5), France 6 September 1944
 Dôle-Tavaux Airfield (Y-7), France 17 September 1944
 Luneville Airfield (Y-2), France 2 January 1945
 AAF Station Stuttgart/Echterdingen (R-50), Germany 3 May 1945 – 20 October 1945
 Camp Shanks, New York 6 November 1945 – 7 November 1945
 Burlington International Airport, Vermont 9 January 2016 – present

Aircraft
 Curtiss P-40 Warhawk, 1942–1944
 Republic P-47 Thunderbolt, 1944–1945
 General Dynamics F-16 Fighting Falcon, 2016–2019
Lockheed Martin F-35 Lightning II, 2019-Present

Awards and Campaigns

See also

 General Dynamics F-16 Fighting Falcon operators
 List of United States Air Force fighter squadrons

References

Notes
 Explanatory notes

 Citations

Bibliography

External links
 

Military units and formations established in 1942
Fighter squadrons of the United States Army Air Forces
Fighter squadrons of the United States Air Force
Military units and formations in Vermont